The 2023 Overwatch League season will be the sixth season of the Overwatch League (OWL), a professional esports league for the video game Overwatch 2. The teams will be split into two regions, the East and the West. In the West Region, a pro-am tournament will take place on March 23, 2023, prior to the official start of the season. The regular season will start on April 27, 2023. In the East Region, Overwatch Contenders teams will be competing alongside Overwatch League teams.

Several teams changed branding and regions for the 2023 season. The Paris Eternal moved from France to Las Vegas, Nevada, and rebranded to the Vegas Eternal, the Philadelphia Fusion moved from Philadelphia to Seoul, South Korea, and rebranded to the Seoul Infernal, the Los Angeles Valiant returned to the West Region, and the Dallas Fuel moved to the East Region.

League format and changes

Rosters construction 
Prior to the start of the season, all teams are required to have minimum of six players, and a maximum of 12 players, signed to season-long contracts. Teams can players to a minimum of one season and could add an option to extend that contract for an additional year, if they so chose. Teams were also allowed to sign players to short-term 30-day contracts, which can only be used on a given player once per season, and two-way contracts. The league reduced the minimum age required to compete from 18 to 17. The free agency window was initially planned to open on November 19, 2022. However, after the announcement that Blizzard licensing agreement with NetEase in China would expire on January 23, 2023, the league delayed the beginning of free agency to December 2, 2022. A day before the new start of free agency, the league once again moved back its starting date to December 23.

Teams and regions 
Several teams have been relocated for the 2023 season. The Paris Eternal relocated to Las Vegas and rebranded to the Vegas Eternal. With their relocation, they became the first OWL team to relocate to a different city. The relocation also left the London Spitfire as the only European representative in the league. The Philadelphia Fusion also relocated to Seoul and rebranded to the Seoul Infernal, marking the first time that an OWL team has made a full rebrand. Since the 2020 season, the Fusion had been running their operations in South Korea; with the rebrand, the Infernal made Seoul their permanent base of operation. The Los Angeles Valiant, who had been competing out of China in the East Region for the past several seasons, returned to the West Region. The 2022 season champions Dallas Fuel also moved from the West region to the East.

Due to Blizzard's licensing agreement with NetEase in China ending, resulting in the four Chinese OWL teams not legally allowed to play Overwatch 2 in their country, the East Region will be expanding to allow Contenders teams to compete in the OWL. A total of 12 teams from several Contenders regions will play in Spring Stage Opens, and the top teams from the Open will play in the OWL Spring Stage.

Preseason 
The official start to the season will be preceded with a pro-am tournament in the West Region beginning on March 23, 2023, in which Overwatch Contenders (OWC) teams will play against OWL teams. A total of 20 teams — seven OWC teams and the 13 OWL Western Region teams — will be split equally into four groups and compete in the pro-am. The top eight teams from the group stage will advance to a single-elimination tournament, and the winner of the tournament will win $100,000.

Regular season 
The regular season will begin on April 27, 2023. In contrast to the previous seasons, which were usually split into four stages, the 2023 season will be split into two stages: Spring and Summer. In the East Region, both stages will begin with Opens, where Contenders teams will compete to play in the OWL. Following, East Region teams, consisting of both Contenders and OWL teams, will play in the Eastern regional qualifiers. No Contenders teams will be playing, and teams will play in the West region, and the West Region start play with the Western regional qualifiers. The top teams from each regions' qualifiers will advance to their region's knockout stage, and the top teams from there will advance to an international tournament event. The Spring Stage will culminate in the international Midseason Madness tournament, while the Summer Stage will culminate with the season playoffs.

Overall standings 

East region

West region

Notable events

Teams start collective bargaining process 
According to esports journalist Jacob Wolf, Overwatch League teams retained British law firm Sheridans to start a collective bargaining process against the league, in an attempt to receive financial assistance after several years of high operating costs and low viewership.

Blizzard's contract with NetEase expires 
On January 24, 2023, Activision Blizzard and NetEase ended their 14-year licensing agreement. With the termination of the agreement, all Activision Blizzard titles that were operated by NetEase, which includes Overwatch 2, went offline in China. This resulted in the four Chinese Overwatch League teams — Chengdu Hunters, Guangzhou Charge, Shanghai Dragons (owned by NetEase), and Hangzhou Spark — no longer being able to play in their home country. Additionally, competitions related to unapproved games in China are not allowed to be broadcast on Chinese live-streaming platforms. While some unapproved games have been broadcast in China in the past, the Chinese government is expected to "strictly enforce" this policy as it pertains to Blizzard titles.

Broadcast 
In early 2020, Activision Blizzard signed a three-year broadcasting rights deal with YouTube, making the streaming platform the exclusive broadcasting partner for the OWL. The 2023 OWL season will the first season since the expiration of the deal.

References

External links 
 

 
Overwatch